Isaac Atwater (May 3, 1818 – December 22, 1906) was an American jurist.

Biography
Born in Homer, New York, Atwater graduated from Yale University and then received his law degree from Yale Law School. Atwater was admitted to the New York bar in 1848. In 1850, Atwater moved to St. Anthony, Minnesota Territory, and continued to practice law. Atwater owned and published the newspaper St. Anthony Express. He helped establish the University of Minnesota while sitting on the board of regents. Atwater served on the Minneapolis City Council and the board of education. He also helped incorporate a business that would build the first bridge between Minneapolis and Saint Paul. Atwater served on the Minnesota Supreme Court from 1858 to 1864. Atwater also wrote about the history of Minnesota. Atwater died in Minneapolis, Minnesota.

Publications
History of the City of Minneapolis, Minnesota, Part I (1893)
History of the City of Minneapolis, Minnesota, Part II (1893)

Notes

1818 births
1906 deaths
People from Homer, New York
Politicians from Minneapolis
Yale Law School alumni
New York (state) lawyers
Writers from New York (state)
Writers from Minneapolis
Editors of Minnesota newspapers
School board members in Minnesota
Minneapolis City Council members
Justices of the Minnesota Supreme Court
Lawyers from Minneapolis
19th-century American politicians
19th-century American judges